Katherine or Catherine Wood may refer to:

Katherine Ellis, née Wood, English dance music vocalist and songwriter
Catherine Marshall, née Wood, American author
Cathie Wood, CEO and CIO of ARK Invest
Catherine Wood, fictional character in A Man Called Peter

See also
Katie Wood, American figure skater
Catherine Woods, entrepreneur and media personality
Kate Woods, film director
Kate Woods (field hockey)